Beavis and Butt-Head Do America is a 1996 American adult animated comedy road film based on the MTV animated television series Beavis and Butt-Head. The film was co-written and directed by series creator Mike Judge, who reprises his roles from the series; Demi Moore, Bruce Willis, Robert Stack, and Cloris Leachman star in supporting roles. The film follows Beavis and Butt-Head, two teen delinquents who travel the US and unknowingly become fugitives.

Previous offers by MTV to adapt Beavis and Butt-Head to film were rejected by Judge, before he eventually agreed to the film in 1994. As production began, the series' staff halted production while Judge wrote the screenplay with Joe Stillman. John Frizzell composed the film's score.

Beavis and Butt-Head Do America premiered at Mann's Chinese Theater on December 15, 1996, and was released in the United States on December 20, 1996 by Paramount Pictures. The film later aired on MTV in 1999. It also aired on VH1 in 2003. The film was a critical and commercial success, grossing $63.1 million in the United States and becoming the largest December box office opening of all time until it was surpassed the following year by Scream 2. A sequel, Beavis and Butt-Head Do the Universe, was released in 2022.

Plot 

Beavis and Butt-Head discover that their television is missing, and set out to find it. After several failed attempts to get a television, they come across a motel which offers one in every room. They meet Muddy Grimes, who mistakes them for hired hitmen and offers them $10,000 to "do" his wife Dallas in Las Vegas. Thinking he  wants them to have sex with her, Butt-Head convinces Beavis that they can "score" and buy a new television.

Muddy drives the boys to the airport. In Las Vegas, Beavis and Butt-Head arrive at their hotel room, but Dallas catches them eavesdropping and holds them at gunpoint. The boys refuse Dallas' offer of $20,000 to "do" Muddy and argue over who will "do" Dallas first. Realizing that Beavis and Butt-Head have misunderstood their instructions, she plants the X-5 unit, a stolen biological weapon, in Beavis' shorts. She tells them to meet her for sex at the U.S. Capitol, but actually plans to kill them and recover the unit.

Beavis and Butt-Head board a tour bus. After they accidentally sabotage Hoover Dam, Agent Flemming of the Bureau of Alcohol, Tobacco and Firearms (ATF) becomes convinced that the duo are criminal masterminds and places them on the FBI's most-wanted list. At Yellowstone National Park, Beavis and Butt-Head accidentally board the wrong bus, joining a busload of nuns who are repulsed by the boys and abandon them in Petrified Forest National Park. After walking through the desert, the boys meet two former Mötley Crüe roadies, oblivious that they are their biological fathers.

Muddy returns to the motel and meets the real hitmen. He angrily swears to track down and kill Beavis and Butt-Head. The hitmen, who stole Beavis and Butt-Head's television, abandon it in front of the motel. Beavis and Butt-Head awaken to find the drifters gone and continue walking until they become dehydrated and weak. Beavis, suffering dehydration, takes a bite out of a peyote cactus, causing him to hallucinate.

Muddy finds Beavis and Butt-Head. After learning that Dallas intends to meet them, he puts them in his trunk and drives on. In Virginia, they jump out onto the interstate and cause a 400-car pileup. They walk past the scene and board their original tour bus, stopping at the Capitol before reaching the White House. Muddy confronts Dallas in a parking garage before she can meet Beavis and Butt-Head. She seduces him and they have sex in his car.

The ATF is dispatched to the White House because Beavis and Butt-Head are there on the same day as a peace conference. Beavis consumes caffeine and sugar and transforms into Cornholio, his hyperactive alter ego. Wandering into the Oval Office, he picks up the red phone, causing a military alert. Butt-Head attempts to seduce Chelsea Clinton but is thrown out of her bedroom window. He is detained and cavity-searched by ATF officers.

Beavis goes to their neighbor Tom Anderson's travel trailer, where Anderson catches him masturbating and throws him out. The ATF, thinking Beavis has the bioweapon, are about to open fire when Anderson throws out Beavis' pants. The bioweapon flies into Butt-Head's hand and he gives it to Flemming. Anderson and his wife are accused of trying to frame Beavis and Butt-Head, and are arrested along with Dallas and Muddy. Flemming proclaims Beavis and Butt-Head heroes, and they meet President Bill Clinton, who makes them honorary ATF agents. Beavis and Butt-Head return to Highland upset that they did not have sex or receive money, but they find their television at the motel and walk into the sunset.

Voice cast 

 Mike Judge as Beavis, Butt-Head,  Tom Anderson,  Mr. Van Driessen, and Principal McVicker
 Bruce Willis as Muddy Grimes
 Demi Moore as Dallas Grimes
 Cloris Leachman as Martha the Old Woman
 Robert Stack as Agent Flemming

Other voice actors include: Jacqueline Barba, Pamela Blair, Eric Bogosian, Kristofor Brown, Tony Darling, John Doman, Francis DuMaurier, Jim Flaherty, Tim Guinee, Toby Huss, Sam Johnson, Richard Linklater, Rosemary McNamara, Harsh Nayyar, Karen Phillips, Dale Reeves, Mike Ruschak, and Gail Thomas

Greg Kinnear had an uncredited role as ATF Agent Bork; David Letterman (credited as Earl Hofert) had a role as a Mötley Crüe roadie.

Production 
Development for the film began in 1993 as part of a production deal with MTV, David Geffen, and Warner Bros. Geffen so believed in the potential of the Beavis and Butt-head TV series that he suggested creating a movie and record album based on the program. They originally conceived it as a live action movie, with Saturday Night Live regulars David Spade and Adam Sandler in mind to play the title characters. After MTV's parent company Viacom acquired Paramount Pictures's parent company Paramount Communications on July 7, 1994, the studio became a partner in the film, replacing Warner's interest in the project and dropping the live action concept under pressure from Beavis and Butt-Head creator Mike Judge. Judge has stated production of the animated film was very ad hoc and had some difficulties with progressing due to most of the staff's television background. The animation of the film was provided by Rough Draft Korea. The hallucination sequence's design and animation was based on the works of Rob Zombie. The sequence's director was Chris Prynoski.

Deleted scene 
When the film premiered on MTV on August 7, 1999, an additional deleted scene followed the airing: while visiting the National Archives, Beavis attempts to use the restroom, but cannot because of the lack of toilet paper in the stall. Coincidentally, Butt-head is angry because the urinals lack the automatic flushing mechanisms that had amazed him at Yellowstone National Park. After the rest of their tour group finishes looking at the encased Declaration of Independence, Beavis sneaks out, breaks the glass with the U.S. flag pole, and steals it to use as "T.P. for his bunghole." While Archive guards rush to see what happened, Beavis cleans up, and exits the stall with a piece of the Declaration, containing John Hancock's signature, stuck to his shoe. The scene does not appear on the DVD, although it is mentioned on the disc's commentary track. In the track, Judge noted that the scene did not test well.

A deleted scene showing Chelsea Clinton packing up to leave the White House was also shot as an alternative to the scene in the film depicting Butt-Head meeting Chelsea in her bedroom, in the event that Bill Clinton should lose his 1996 reelection bid to Bob Dole; however, by the spring of 1996, Judge chose to keep the original scene, feeling confident that Clinton would win his reelection bidwhich he ultimately did that November.

Reception

Box office 
Beavis and Butt-Head Do America opened Number 1 in North America on December 20, 1996, and earned $63.1 million at the US box office after opening at #1 with $20.1 million. It had a $12 million production budget.

Critical reception 
The consensus reads: "Beavis and Butt-Head Do America is unabashedly offensive, unapologetically stupid, and unexpectedly funny." On Metacritic, the film has a 64 out of 100 rating based on 16 critics, indicating "generally favorable reviews". Audiences polled by CinemaScore gave the film an average grade of "B+" on an A+ to F scale.

Roger Ebert of Chicago Sun-Times praised the film as a "vulgar" satire on American youth, and compared it favorably  to Wayne's World.<ref>Roger Ebert's review of Beavis and Butt-head Do America]</ref> On the film review show Siskel and Ebert, Ebert's reviewing partner Gene Siskel gave the film a "modest recommendation", having been taken with the two lead characters. Ebert and Siskel ultimately awarded it a "two thumbs up" rating. In a retrospective review in Jacobin for the film's 25th anniversary, writer Leonard Pierce praised Beavis and Butt-Head Do America for its continued relevancy into the 21st century. Pierce described the film as "the greatest satire of the twenty-first-century American security state," adding that "we wouldn’t be talking about the film at all today if it wasn’t still painfully funny, with a distinctly 2020s nervous energy and a rowdy, bubbling pace that never slows down." Pierce concluded that Beavis and Butt-Head Do America "seems far fresher today than anything Matt Stone and Trey Parker have done this century."

 Awards and nominations 

 Home media 
The film was released on VHS on June 10, 1997 and on DVD on November 23, 1999, by Paramount Home Entertainment. It was re-released on a Special Edition DVD in 2006 as "The Edition That Doesn't Suck".

The video went straight to number one in the official UK video charts on release of which it stayed at the number one spot for two weeks before moving to number two during its third week. The movie spent a total of 17 weeks on the official video charts in the UK.

The film was released on Blu-ray for the first time on December 7, 2021 by Paramount Home Entertainment, in commemoration of the film's 25th anniversary.

 Sequel 

In the years following, many fans rumored the possibility of a sequel or follow-up to the film, tentatively titled Beavis and Butt-Head: The Sequel or Beavis and Butt-Head 2. On August 31, 2009, during the promotion of Extract, Mike Judge said he would like to see Beavis and Butt-Head on the big screen again. In 2019, Judge revealed that he has "some ideas" for a new film, saying there might be potential for a live-action version of the show. In February 2021, it was announced that a new Beavis and Butt-Head movie was in production for Paramount+, with Mike Judge on board. It was released on June 23, 2022.

 Soundtrack 

Noticeably missing are "Mucha Muchacha", the version of "Lesbian Seagull" with Mr. Van Driessen singing, and the score tracks performed by The London Metropolitan Orchestra, which were released on a separate album.

"Two Cool Guys", written and performed by soul/funk musician Isaac Hayes, is a semi-parody of Hayes' Academy Award-winning "Theme from Shaft". It incorporates the theme from the Beavis and Butt-head television series as a rhythm guitar line, and series creator Mike Judge, who wrote the theme, is given a co-writing credit with Hayes in the soundtrack liner notes. The opening credit sequence which the song features is a take-off on popular 1970s cop movies and TV shows with Beavis and Butt-Head as hip ace sleuth Lothario detectives.

The version of Ozzy Osbourne's "Walk on Water" is not the same version included in the film. The film used an earlier demo version, while the soundtrack itself contains a later, revised version. The original demo, which appears in the film, can be found on Osbourne's Prince of Darkness box set.  Ozzy and co-writer Jim Vallance both prefer the demo version heard in the film. "Walk on Water" was released as a single and peaked at number 28 on Billboards Mainstream Rock Tracks chart.

The use of AC/DC's "Gone Shootin'" is particularly fitting for the series, as Judge himself would eventually admit the guitar solo that serves as the show's theme was in fact the solo from the AC/DC song played backwards.

The soundtrack was re-released in 2016 on a special edition LP picture disc.

Certifications

See also
 List of films set in Las Vegas

 References 

 External links 

 
 
 
 
 
 [https://www.bcdb.com/bcdb/cartoon.cgi?film=23613&cartoon=Beavis%20and%20Butt-head%20Do%20America Beavis and Butt-head Do America at the Big Cartoon DataBase
 Beavis and Butt-Head Do America Review on Entertainment Weekly''
 Beavis and Butt-Head Do America review on Consequence of Sound

1996 films
1990s English-language films
Beavis and Butt-Head films
1996 animated films
1996 action comedy films
1996 directorial debut films
1990s adventure comedy films
1990s American animated films
1990s buddy comedy films
1990s comedy road movies
Adult animated comedy films
American action comedy films
American adventure comedy films
American black comedy films
American buddy comedy films
American crime comedy films
American high school films
American political comedy films
American comedy road movies
Animated action films
Animated adventure films
Animated buddy films
American animated comedy films
Animated teen films
Animated films based on animated series
Animated films about friendship
Bureau of Alcohol, Tobacco, Firearms and Explosives in fiction
Films about drugs
Films directed by Mike Judge
Films scored by John Frizzell (composer)
Films based on television series
Films set in Idaho
Films set in the Las Vegas Valley
Films set in Nevada
Films set in Texas
Films set in Virginia
Films set in Washington, D.C.
Films set in Wyoming
The Geffen Film Company films
MTV Films films
MTV animated films
Paramount Pictures animated films
Paramount Pictures films
Rough Draft Studios films
Films with screenplays by Joe Stillman
Films with screenplays by Mike Judge
1996 comedy films
American adult animated films
Cultural depictions of Bill Clinton
American satirical films
1990s satirical films
American crime films
Films set in the Yellowstone National Park